This is a list of the top 50 singles of 2005 in New Zealand.

Chart

Key
 – Song of New Zealand origin

Notes

References

External links
 The Official NZ Music Chart, RIANZ website

2005 in New Zealand music
2005 record charts
Singles 2005